Irata or IRATA may refer to:

 Al Irata, a terrorist group
 Irata, a fictitious planet in the early 1980s computer game, M.U.L.E.
 IRATA, the Industrial Rope Access Trade Association.
 Iratta, a 2023 Indian film